Antiphanes of Delos was a Greek physician. He has been quoted by Caelius Aurelianus and Galen, and must therefore have lived some time in or before the 2nd century AD. He is mentioned by Clement of Alexandria as having said "the sole cause of diseases in man was the too great variety of his food."

References

2nd-century BC Greek physicians
Ancient Delos
Year of birth unknown
Year of death unknown